Caimbeul is a surname. Notable people with the surname include:

Alexander Campbell (disambiguation), several people named Alexander Campbell
Aonghas Pàdraig Caimbeul (born 1952), Scottish award-winning poet, novelist, journalist, broadcaster and actor
Cailean Mor Caimbeul (died 1296), also known as Sir Colin Campbell, one of the earliest attested members of Clan Campbell
Maoilios Caimbeul (born 1944), award-winning Scottish writer of poetry, prose and children's literature
Niall Caimbeul, several people named Neil Campbell
Niall Caimbeul (bishop) (died 1613), the son of Alasdair mac a' Phearsain, a member of the Campbells of Carnassarie

See also
Cambell (disambiguation)
Cambil
Campbell (disambiguation)
Campel
Cumbel